"Teenage Letter" is a song written by Renald Richard.

The original version (spelled "Teen Age Letter" on the record label) was recorded in October 1957 by Big Joe Turner and released as a single (Atlantic 45–1167) in the same year.

The song has since been covered by a number of artists, including Billy Lee Riley and Jerry Lee Lewis.

References 

1957 songs
1957 singles
Atlantic Records singles
Big Joe Turner songs

Jerry Lee Lewis songs